St. Anna's Church is a Roman Catholic church in Sint-Anna-Pede, in the municipality of Dilbeek, Belgium. It is depicted in The Blind Leading the Blind by Pieter Breughel the Elder.

History
St. Anna's Church was built around 1250. Founded by the Beguine convent of Brussels. It is mentioned in  apud Pede juxta nova capella ("at Pede near the new chapel").

The nave of the church was erected in the 16th century. In the 17th century, the church was renovated in a Gothic style, with the addition of a rib vault.

The church and surroundings were protected in 1948.

Architecture
St. Anna's Church is built in sandstone, combined with layers of bricks. It has both Romanesque and Gothic architectural characteristics. The church furniture includes a wooden pulpit with an image of the Good Shepherd (18th century), the statues of Saint Joseph (18th century) and the wooden statue of St. Anna with her daughter Maria (17th century). 

The church is situated in the middle of a former cemetery and is surrounded by a copse of trees.

The Blind Leading the Blind

St. Anna's Church is depicted in the painting The Blind Leading the Blind by Pieter Breughel the Elder.
The painting shows six blind men walking past the Pedebeek. The first one has already fallen and is lying in the stream. The second one tries to keep his balance, but starts to fall anyway. In his fall, he drags the third one with him. The last three have yet to fall.

According to a local legend, the painter lived at the time in the small castle which is also represented in the painting.

References

Dilbeek
Roman Catholic churches in Belgium
Churches in Flemish Brabant